Hop Back, one of England's small breweries, brewers of Summer Lightning, Crop Circle, G.F.B. and other beers was founded by John and Julie Gilbert. Beer was first brewed in 1986 at the Wyndham Arms in Salisbury, and moved to larger premises in Downton six years later. , Hop Back own eleven public houses around the south of England.

Beers

Summer Lightning 5.0% ABV
G.F.B. (Gilbert's First Brew) 3.5% ABV
Crop Circle 4.2% ABV
Entire Stout 4.5% ABV
CAMRA Champion Winter Beer of Britain 2011
Odyssey 4.0% ABV
Taiphoon 4.2% ABV

Pubs
The Dolphin
The Duck
The Gluepot
The Hopleaf
The Archer
The Southgate
The Sultan
The Waterloo Arms
The Wyndham Arms

References

External links
Hop Back Brewery website
Brewery profile from Ratebeer.com

Companies based in Wiltshire
Breweries in England
British companies established in 1986
Food and drink companies established in 1986
1986 establishments in England